Warner Bros. Presents Montrose! is the third studio album by American hard rock band Montrose, released on Warner Bros. Records on 26 September 1975.

It is the first Montrose album released after the departure of singer Sammy Hagar and also the first not produced by Ted Templeman.  Bob James, an unknown vocalist and songwriter from the South Bay area of Los Angeles who had been singing in a Montrose cover band, was chosen as Hagar's successor in early 1975. Another newcomer from Los Angeles, Jim Alcivar, joined the band on keyboards, making this the first Montrose album to feature a keyboardist as a full member of the band. At this juncture guitarist band leader Ronnie Montrose parted ways with Ted Templeman and chose to self-produce the album.

In 1971, singer-songwriter Kendell Kardt, formerly of the band Rig, recorded a solo album, Buddy Bolden, featuring guests Jerry Garcia and Ronnie Montrose, both of whom played on the songs "Buddy Bolden" and "Black Train". "Black Train" was written by Kardt about the heroin-overdose death of an unnamed friend of Rig guitarist Arthur Richards. The original Kendell Kardt version of the song has a Country & Western feel with Garcia on pedal steel guitar and Montrose on lead guitar and Hawaiian lap steel. A shakeup at Capitol resulted in Kardt's contract being dropped and the album being shelved. Ronnie Montrose's motivation for choosing to unearth the unreleased track for a more aggressive reinterpretation may have stemmed from the guitarist's vehement personal anti-drug/anti-alcohol stance at the time, exemplified by his insistence that all Montrose band members abide by a strict policy of drug and alcohol-free performances.

The album achieved the second highest chart position of the four Montrose releases, reaching No. 79 in the Billboard 200. It was critically praised and also noted for its movie-poster cover art, giving the impression that Warner Bros. Records was presenting a rock band like a big budget Hollywood production.

Track listing 
Credits adapted from the album liner notes.

Personnel
Montrose
 Bob James – lead vocals
 Ronnie Montrose – guitar, vocals, producer
 Jim Alcivar – keyboards
 Alan Fitzgerald – bass
 Denny Carmassi – drums

Additional musicians
 Novi Novog – viola (Track 4)

Production
 Charles Faris – engineer
 John Henning – associate engineer

References

Other sources
 Montrose; "Warner Bros. Presents... Montrose!" liner notes; Warner Bros. Records 1975

1975 albums
Montrose (band) albums
Warner Records albums